The 2022 Ligue de Football de Saint Pierre et Miquelon was the 37th season of top-division football in Saint Pierre and Miquelon. Three clubs competed in the league: AS Saint Pierraise, A.S. Miquelonnaise and A.S. Ilienne Amateur. 

Saint Pierraise won their 13th league title, and their first since 2019.

Clubs

Table

References 

Ligue de Football de Saint Pierre et Miquelon seasons
Saint Pierre and Miquelon